Eshagh Sobhani is an Iranian footballer.

Club career
Sobhani joined Saipa F.C. in 2011, after playing the previous two seasons at Mes Sarcheshmeh in the Azadegan League.

 Assist Goals

References

External sources
Persianleague Profile

Living people
Saipa F.C. players
Mes Sarcheshme players
Iranian footballers
1984 births
Association football midfielders
People from Kerman Province